The 2022–23 AdmiralBet ABA League is the 21st season of the ABA League with 14 teams from former Yugoslavia, namely Bosnia and Herzegovina, Croatia, Montenegro, North Macedonia, Serbia, and Slovenia participating in it. It is the first time since the 2017–18 season with a club from North Macedonia participating in it.

Teams

Promotion and relegation 
A total of 14 teams will contest the league in the 2022–23 season (and until the 2024–25 season).

Venues and locations

Personnel and sponsorship

Coaching changes

Referees
A total of 55 ABA officials set to work on the 2022–23 season in ABA 1 and ABA 2:

Regular season 
The regular season is scheduled commence on 1 October 2022 and end on 16 April 2023.

League table

Positions by round

Results

Results by round 
The table lists the results of teams in each round.

MVP List

MVP of the Round

Source: ABA League

MVP of the Month

Clubs in European competitions

See also 
 List of current ABA League First Division team rosters
 2022–23 ABA League Second Division

ABA teams
 2022–23 KK Crvena zvezda season
 2022–23 KK Partizan season

 2022–23 domestic competitions
  2022–23 Basketball Championship of Bosnia and Herzegovina
  2022–23 HT Premijer liga
  2022–23 Prva A liga
  2022–23 Macedonian First League
  2022–23 Basketball League of Serbia
  2022–23 Slovenian Basketball League

References

ABA League seasons
2022–23 ABA League First Division
2022–23 in European basketball leagues
2022–23 in Bosnia and Herzegovina basketball
2022–23 in Croatian basketball
2022–23 in Montenegrin basketball
2022–23 in Serbian basketball
2022–23 in Slovenian basketball
ABA